The Foleşti mine is a large salt mine located in southern Romania in Vâlcea County, close to Tomșani. Foleşti represents one of the largest salt reserves in Romania having estimated reserves of 22 billion tonnes of NaCl.

References 

Salt mines in Romania